Lego, is a town located in Bay, Somalia. It is situated 100 kilometres northwest of the capital Mogadishu and approximately 20 km west of Yaqbiriweyne and 54 km east of Burhakaba.

History
It is located on the road between Burhakaba and Bali Dogle in Lower Shabelle region. In 2006, the village was the site of the Battle of Jowhar between forces of the Somali Transitional Federal Government and the Islamic Courts Union. In 2015, the area was the scene of heavy fighting between al-Shabaab militants and African Union troops in May and June 2015 with one notable instance being the Battle of Leego. In 2017, the town was retaken by al-Shabaab following the withdrawal of AMISOM troops as result of the Golweyn ambush.

References

Bay, Somalia